Brigadier Johan Potgieter was a South African Army officer from the artillery who served as OC School of Artillery, SA Military College, Director Artillery, SA Military Academy and later Orange Free State Command. He was appointed the OC 2 Military Area from late 1975 in Operation Savannah.

Army career 

He completed the Staff Course at the Staff College, Camberley during 1968 and served as Officer Commanding School of Artillery from 19681969, SA Army College from 19691971, Director of Artillery and SA Military Academy during 19731975. He died after being shot down during Ops Savannah in a Puma helicopter.

Awards and decorations

References

–

South African generals
1976 deaths
1935 births
Graduates of the Staff College, Camberley
Afrikaner people
South African people of Dutch descent
South African military personnel of the Border War